Mario Tennis is a 2000 sports video game developed by Camelot Software Planning and published by Nintendo for the Nintendo 64. Following Mario's Tennis, it is the second game in the Mario Tennis series. The game is known for being the introduction of Luigi's arch-rival, Waluigi, and the re-introduction of Princess Daisy and Birdo. 

Camelot developed a Game Boy Color version and it was published under the same title in Western regions and as Mario Tennis GB in Japan.

The N64 version was re-released on the Wii and Wii U Virtual Console, and on the Nintendo Switch Online + Expansion Pack, in 2010, 2015, and 2021 respectively, while the GBC version was re-released on the Nintendo 3DS Virtual Console in 2014.

Gameplay 
The game uses a control system that differs from most other video tennis games on the market. Shots are performed by pressing one, or both, of the two main buttons (A or B), which make the ball spin in different ways. Pressing a button twice strikes the tennis shot with more power and spin. Additionally, pressing the two buttons in a different order can result in a different type of shot altogether, such as a lob or drop shot. Both buttons can be pressed at the same time to hit a very powerful smash shot. The longer a button is pressed before contact is made with the ball, the stronger the shot will be. The control system allows players of all levels to become familiar with the mechanics of the game within a very short time, whilst also encouraging advanced players to take advantage of the variety of shots offered to come up with different strategies for winning points. A total of seven types of shot are possible using only the two main buttons of the controller. These gameplay mechanics were later brought to the newer games of the Mario Tennis series.

Marking the sixth Mario game for the Nintendo 64, Mario Tennis brought eleven new characters to the Mario Tennis franchise, including Waluigi (who made his first appearance in this game), Princess Daisy, Wario, Shy Guy, Donkey Kong and Birdo.

Handheld version 
The Game Boy Color (GBC) version features a role-playing game mode, which is not in the Nintendo 64 (N64) version. In this mode, players begin as a rookie tennis player at the Royal Tennis Academy, who must build up their skill by leveling up through training and practice matches before entering various tournaments. The aim of this mode is to be crowned champion at the academy, although the second part of the game involves the player competing in a tournament to ultimately face Mario, the best tennis player. The role-playing is playable in singles and doubles (separately), effectively doubling the game's longevity. There are training facilities that can help the player progress. The game also features mini-games such as a tennis version of a shooting gallery where, as Donkey Kong, the player must hit the banana targets on the wall to earn points in a set amount of time. A variety of human and Mario characters are available for the player to use.

Transfer Pak features 
Through the use of a Nintendo 64 Transfer Pak, players are able to import their characters from the GBC version of Mario Tennis to the N64 game, as well as the characters' stats. Using these characters, experience points may be earned to transfer back to the GBC version. As the characters go up in levels, the player may send their improved characters to the N64 version to level up again. Linking the two games also unlocks Yoshi, Wario, Waluigi, Bowser and their respective mini-games in the GBC version; completing these mini-games and connecting the two games again will in turn unlock up to six new tennis courts in the N64 version.

All Transfer Pak functionality has been removed from subsequent digital re-releases of both games. Other features, such as the Ring Tournament mode in the N64 version and multiplayer functionality in the GBC version, are also omitted.

Development 
At Nintendo's suggestion, Princess Daisy was brought back from obscurity after having only ever appeared in Super Mario Land and NES Open Tournament Golf in order to give Luigi a doubles partner like Mario had Peach. Camelot asked Nintendo if the game could also feature girlfriends for Wario and Waluigi, but Miyamoto said that he "didn't even want to see their girlfriends."

Reception 

Mario Tennis received critical acclaim, with critics citing the accessibility and depth of the controls as being very impressive. The game physics and amount of content have also been praised. The Nintendo 64 version received "universal acclaim" according to the review aggregation website Metacritic. The game was a runner-up for GameSpot's annual "Best Nintendo 64 Game" award, losing to Perfect Dark. Its Game Boy Color version was nominated for the publication's 2001 "Best Game Boy Color Game" award, which went to Oracle of Seasons and Oracle of Ages.

Dutch magazine Power Unlimited gave the N64 version a score of 9.1 out of 10, calling it very addictive, especially with four players.

Mario Tennis sold over 200,000 copies within two weeks of its release. It became the eighth best selling Game Boy Color game in Japan, with 357,987 copies sold.

Notes

References

External links 
 Official Nintendo Japan Mario Tennis 64 site
 Official Nintendo Japan Mario Tennis Game Boy Color site
 Mario Tennis profile in Wii U Virtual Console
 
 
 
 Mario Tennis at Nintendo.com (archives of the original at the Internet Archive)
 Mario Tennis on the Super Mario Wiki

 
2000 video games
Camelot Software Planning games
Game Boy Color games
Games with Transfer Pak support
Interactive Achievement Award winners
Multiplayer and single-player video games
Nintendo 64 games
Nintendo Switch Online games
Tennis in fiction
Tennis video games
Video games developed in Japan
Video games scored by Motoi Sakuraba
Virtual Console games for Wii
Virtual Console games for Wii U
D.I.C.E. Award for Family Game of the Year winners